The Joint Military School at Koulikoro is one of two significant training establishments if the Malian Armed Forces. Its mission is to train active and reserve officers and the promotion of scientific and technological research.

History 
It was created on 1 October 1962 to Kati. In 1964 and 1965, the school trained fighters of several African national liberation movements: African National Congress of South Africa, SWAPO, FRELIMO, MPLA, and ZANU. On July 27, 1967, President Modibo Keita visited the School, who called its personnel "the most conscious and most dynamic forward force". In 1980, 18 years later after its establishment, it was transferred. The duration of the training cycle was reduced from three to two years after he 42nd graduation in 2020. In order to contribute to African integration, it opened its doors to military students from different African countries in 1993. It was reorganized on 17 November 2000.

Activities 
In a speech on August 1, 2008 at a ceremony at the school, then-President Amadou Toumani Toure formulated this new mission as follows: “The duty of the army is to fight, and the main mission is, above all, to support peace". A section of the European Union Training Mission in Mali is based at the school. Malian figures, politicians generals and foreign officials such as President of Chad Idriss Déby have presided over the graduation of troops. Since 1993, military personnel from 12 African countries have been training in it: Burkina Faso, Benin, Cameroon, Gabon, Guinea, Mauritania, Niger, Central African Republic, Côte d'Ivoire, Senegal, Chad and Togo.

Alumni 

 Amadou Toumani Touré, former President of Mali
 Cheick Oumar Diarra, former Minister of Transport and Public Works
 Kafougouna Koné, Minister of Defense of Mali
 Bah Ndaw, President of Mali (Interim)
 Sadio Gassama, former Minister of Defence and Veterans Affairs

References 

Educational institutions established in 1962
1962 establishments in Mali
Military academies
Military of Mali